Huskvarna River (Swedish: Huskvarnaån) is a river in Småland, Sweden.

References

Rivers of Jönköping County